Faribault is a French surname that may refer to:

Persons

 Alexander Faribault, American trading post owner and territorial legislator
 E.R. Faribault, Geological Survey of Canada
 George-Barthélemy Faribault (1789–1866), Canadian archaeologist
 Jean-Baptiste Faribault (1775–1860), American fur trader
 Joseph-Édouard Faribault (1773–1859), notary and political figure in Lower Canada.
 Marcel Faribault, (1908–1972), Canadian notary, businessman and administrator

Places

Canada
Faribault River, a tributary of the Chibougamau River in Quebec

United States
Faribault County, Minnesota
 Faribault County Courthouse
Faribault, Minnesota, a city in Rice County Minnesota
 Minnesota Correctional Facility – Faribault
 Faribault Woolen Mills
 Alexander Faribault House

Other uses

 USS Faribault (AK-179) was an Alamosa-class cargo ship acquired by the U.S. Navy during the final months of World War II.